Interstate 70 (I-70) in the US state of Ohio provides access between Indiana and West Virginia. I-70 is a major highway for traffic within, to, from, and through Ohio. The highway is a core roadway of the Columbus metropolitan area and is of additional importance in the Dayton metropolitan area.

Route description
Along its path through Ohio, I-70 passes through the following counties: Preble, Montgomery, Clark, Madison, Franklin, Fairfield, Licking, Muskingum, Guernsey, and Belmont. As an Interstate Highway, by default, I-70 is a part of the National Highway System, a network of highways deemed most important for the country's economy, mobility, and defense.

The portion of I-70 between I-675 and Enon Road in Clark County is designated as the "Deputy Suzanne Hopper Memorial Highway", in honor of a Clark County Sheriff's deputy who was shot and killed on January 1, 2011, while responding to reports of gunshots at a mobile home park on Enon Road, near I-70.

The portion of I-70 between milemarkers 51 and 53 in Clark County is designated as the "Trooper Charles V. Vogel, Jr. Memorial Highway", in honor of a 24-year-old trooper with the Springfield post of the Ohio State Highway Patrol who was struck and killed by a vehicle on January 24, 1980, while investigating a crash at the junction of I-70 and U.S. Route 68 (US 68; which is located along the designated stretch of highway).

Western Ohio 
I-70's first exit within Ohio is in New Westerville, just south of New Paris. The exit is only accessible eastbound, and traffic going on to I-70 using the exit-only enters westbound lanes. I-70 goes on to pass Gettysburg before making two exits near Lewisburg, one at a junction with US 127 and another near downtown Lewisburg. I-70 also makes an exit in Brookville and runs concurrent with State Route 49 (SH 49) for just under  before SH 49 continues to the southeast. 

At this point, I-70 comes its closest to Dayton and primarily serves rural suburbs. Within the northern Dayton section of I-70, a separate series of ramps serves traffic to Dayton International Airport before entering a major intersection with I-75 just south of Vandalia. From there, I-70 continues to serve northern Dayton suburbs and also junctions the SH 4 expressway, which runs concurrent with I-70 between Wright-Patterson Air Force Base and Enon, and I-675, a bypass route of Downtown Dayton.

After another interchange with US 68, I-70 passes south of Springfield and serves three exits, the easternmost of which serves as one of the many junctions I-70 has with the National Road (today known as US 40).

Central Ohio 
I-70 is a major freeway within the Columbus metropolitan area, serving as the primary east–west route. After brief exits just outside the towns of Summerford and West Jefferson, I-70 reaches the southern part of Hilliard, where I-70 makes its first junction with I-270, a ring road around the Columbus area primarily serving its suburbs. Between the I-270 interchanges on I-70, hazmats are prohibited. I-70 continues toward Downtown Columbus and, upon entering Valleyview, reaches I-670, a highway serving north-central Columbus as well as both Easton Town Center and John Glenn Columbus International Airport. I-70 itself continues south and meets up with I-71 and SH 315 in a major interchange to the east of Franklinton. Throughout the rest of the route in central Ohio, I-70 serves state routes and rural towns like Kirkersville and Buckeye Lake.

I-70 is also the only major expressway within the Zanesville area and bisects the central business district and serves the area with exits to both the central business district and Zanesville Municipal Airport. Once I-70 passes outside of Zanesville, the road connects with Norwich and New Concord, the latter of which also includes Muskingum University and the John and Annie Glenn Museum.

Eastern Ohio 
Running roughly parallel with both US 22 and US 40, I-70 passes through Georgetown to serve Cambridge, which is also where I-70 interchanges with I-77. Between the I-77 interchange and St. Clairsville, I-70 is a rural highway with few exits serving small towns along its path. 

Eastbound traffic can either continue on I-70 toward Wheeling's central business district or use I-470 as a bypass of Wheeling. I-70 itself serves a few more exits in Wheeling's western area before crossing the Fort Henry Bridge and the state line into downtown Wheeling.

History
I-70 appeared on the original American Association of State Highway and Transportation Officials (AASHTO) interstate route numbering map from August 14, 1957. It was envisioned as a modern upgrade of the old National Road (US 40), the main east–west route through the heart of the state, built closely parallel to, but on a separate alignment from, the then overburdened and obsolete highway. The  section between Kirkersville and Gratiot (current exits 122–142) was the first new construction opened to traffic in 1959. At that time, the highway was accessed at both ends via temporary at-grade intersections with the old National Pike, with I-70 and US 40 sharing the same carriageways.

Once the road was extended westward toward Columbus by 1968, access was routed to exit 122, with the western  access road continuing US 40 back to the old National Pike becoming part of SR 158 (though the westbound lanes were abandoned), with SH 158's old alignment north of the access road being turned over to Licking County. The following year, the highway was opened eastward to Zanesville, with a new interchange, exit 142, at Gratiot. The at-grade intersection with the old National Pike was subsequently blocked off, to be erased by years of overgrowth. The US 40 designation was returned to the Pike around the same time, replacing the temporary SR 440 designation.

In February 2013, an  segment of I-70 traveling through Franklin, Fairfield, and Licking counties was named by the National Asphalt Pavement Association as the winner of the 2012 Sheldon G. Hayes Award for the best asphalt pavement in the country.

Exit list

Auxiliary routes

Interstate 70 Alternate

Interstate 70 Alternate (I-70 Alt.) is an alternate route for I-70, bypassing several exits on I-70.

See also

Interstate 70 Business (Springfield, Ohio)

References

 Ohio
70
Transportation in Preble County, Ohio
Transportation in Montgomery County, Ohio
Transportation in Clark County, Ohio
Transportation in Madison County, Ohio
Transportation in Franklin County, Ohio
Transportation in Fairfield County, Ohio
Transportation in Licking County, Ohio
Transportation in Muskingum County, Ohio
Transportation in Guernsey County, Ohio
Transportation in Belmont County, Ohio